The Nice to Digne line (French: Ligne de Nice à Digne), is a French Metre-gauge railway line connecting Nice to Digne-les-Bains at .

It is operated by Chemins de fer de Provence and is the only remaining Train des Pignes.

References

Metre gauge railways in France